This is a list of 1997 British incumbents.

Government
 Monarch
 Head of State - Elizabeth II, Queen of the United Kingdom (1952–2022)
 Prime Minister
 Head of Government - John Major, Prime Minister of the United Kingdom (1990–1997)
 Head of Government - Tony Blair, Prime Minister of the United Kingdom (1997–2007)
First Lord of the Treasury
 John Major, First Lord of the Treasury (1990–1997)
 Tony Blair, First Lord of the Treasury (1997–2007)
Chancellor of the Exchequer
 Kenneth Clarke, Chancellor of the Exchequer (1993–1997)
 Gordon Brown, Chancellor of the Exchequer (1997–2007)
Second Lord of the Treasury
 Kenneth Clarke, Second Lord of the Treasury (1993–1997)
 Gordon Brown, Second Lord of the Treasury (1997–2007)
Secretary of State for Foreign and Commonwealth Affairs
 Malcolm Rifkind, Secretary of State for Foreign and Commonwealth Affairs (1995–1997)
 Robin Cook, Secretary of State for Foreign and Commonwealth Affairs (1997–2001)
Secretary of State for the Home Department
 Michael Howard, Secretary of State for the Home Department (1993–1997)
 Jack Straw, Secretary of State for the Home Department (1997–2001)
Minister of Agriculture, Fisheries and Food
 Douglas Hogg, Minister of Agriculture, Fisheries and Food (1995–1997)
 Jack Cunningham, Minister of Agriculture, Fisheries and Food (1997–1998)
Secretary of State for Environment, Transport and the Regions
 Sir George Young, Bt., Secretary of State for Transport (1995–1997)
 Gavin Strang, Secretary of State for Environment, Transport and the Regions (1997–1998)
Secretary of State for Scotland
 Michael Forsyth, Secretary of State for Scotland (1995–1997)
 Donald Dewar, Secretary of State for Scotland (1997–1999)
Secretary of State for Health
 Stephen Dorrell, Secretary of State for Health (1995–1997)
 Frank Dobson, Secretary of State for Health (1997–1999)
Secretary of State for Northern Ireland
 Sir Patrick Mayhew, Secretary of State for Northern Ireland (1992–1997)
 Mo Mowlam, Secretary of State for Northern Ireland (1997–1999)
Secretary of State for Defence
 Michael Portillo, Secretary of State for Defence (1995–1997)
 Lord Robertson of Port Ellen, Secretary of State for Defence (1997–1999)
Secretary of State for Trade and Industry
 Ian Lang, Secretary of State for Trade and Industry (1995–1997)
 Margaret Beckett, Secretary of State for Trade and Industry (1997–1998)
Secretary of State for Culture, Media and Sport
 Virginia Bottomley, Secretary of State for National Heritage (1995–1997)
 Chris Smith, Secretary of State for Culture, Media and Sport (1997–2001)
Secretary of State for Education and Employment
 Gillian Shepherd, Secretary of State for Education and Employment (1995–1997)
 David Blunkett, Secretary of State for Education and Employment (1997–2001)
Secretary of State for Wales
 William Hague, Secretary of State for Wales (1995–1997)
 Ron Davies, Secretary of State for Wales (1997–1998)
Lord Privy Seal
 Robert Gascoyne-Cecil, 7th Marquess of Salisbury, Lord Privy Seal (1994–1997)
 Lord Richard, Lord Privy Seal (1997–1998)
Leader of the House of Commons
 Tony Newton, Leader of the House of Commons (1992–1997)
 Ann Taylor, Baroness Taylor of Bolton, Leader of the House of Commons (1997–1998)
Lord President of the Council
 Tony Newton, Lord President of the Council (1992–1997)
 Ann Taylor, Baroness Taylor of Bolton, Lord President of the Council (1997–1998)
Lord Chancellor
 James Mackay, Baron Mackay of Clashfern, Lord Chancellor (1987–1997)
 Derry Irvine, Baron Irvine of Lairg, Lord Chancellor (1997–2003)
Secretary of State for International Development
 Clare Short, Secretary of State for International Development (1997–2003)
Secretary of State for Social Security
 Peter Lilley, Secretary of State for Social Security (1992–1997)
 Harriet Harman, Secretary of State for Social Security (1997–1998)
Chancellor of the Duchy of Lancaster
 Roger Freeman, Chancellor of the Duchy of Lancaster (1995–1997)
 David G. Clark, Chancellor of the Duchy of Lancaster (1997–1998)

Religion
 Archbishop of Canterbury
George Carey, Archbishop of Canterbury (1991–2002)
 Archbishop of York
 David Hope, Archbishop of York (1995–2005)

Leaders
1997
British incumbents